George County is a county located in the U.S. state of Mississippi. As of the 2020 census, the population was 24,350. Its county seat is Lucedale. The county is named for James Z. George, US Senator from Mississippi.

George County is included in the Pascagoula, MS Metropolitan Statistical Area. The county is located near the Alabama state line.

History
George County was named after Senator James Z. George and was formed on 16 March 1910 from parts of land formerly included in Jackson and Greene Counties.

The Gulf, Mobile and Ohio Railroad ran through Lucedale on its way to Mobile.

Geography

Major highways
  U.S. Highway 98
  Mississippi Highway 26
  Mississippi Highway 57
  Mississippi Highway 63
  Mississippi Highway 198

Adjacent counties
 Greene County (north)
 Mobile County, Alabama (east)
 Jackson County (south)
 Stone County (west)
 Perry County (northwest)

National protected area
 De Soto National Forest (part)

Demographics

2020 census

As of the 2020 United States census, there were 24,350 people, 7,592 households, and 5,309 families residing in the county.

2000 census
As of the census of 2000, there were 19,144 people, 6,742 households, and 5,305 families residing in the county.  The population density was 40 people per square mile (15/km2).  There were 7,513 housing units at an average density of 16 per square mile (6/km2).  The racial makeup of the county was 89.38% White, 8.82% African American, 0.24% Native American, 0.16% Asian, 0.84% from other races, and 0.57% from two or more races.  1.60% of the population were Hispanic or Latino of any race.

There were 6,742 households, out of which 38.70% had children under the age of 18 living with them, 64.00% were married couples living together, 10.40% had a female householder with no husband present, and 21.30% were non-families. 19.10% of all households were made up of individuals, and 8.20% had someone living alone who was 65 years of age or older.  The average household size was 2.78 and the average family size was 3.17.

In the county, the population was spread out, with 29.20% under the age of 18, 9.40% from 18 to 24, 28.60% from 25 to 44, 21.90% from 45 to 64, and 10.90% who were 65 years of age or older.  The median age was 33 years. For every 100 females, there were 100.60 males.  For every 100 females age 18 and over, there were 98.60 males.

The median income for a household in the county was $34,730, and the median income for a family was $39,386. Males had a median income of $33,575 versus $20,542 for females. The per capita income for the county was $14,337.  About 13.00% of families and 16.70% of the population were below the poverty line, including 20.80% of those under age 18 and 20.20% of those age 65 or over.

Politics
The county has gone solidly Republican in the last nine Presidential elections. In past Presidential elections third-party candidates sometimes did well here. In 1968 George Wallace won the county with over 90 percent of the vote, which was the second highest percentage he received in any county. In 1988 the county gave David Duke 4.21%, which was the highest percentage he received. In that election it also gave more support to Lenora Fulani than she received in most of the nation. In 2012, President Obama only received 14% of the vote, and Hillary Clinton received barely ten percent in 2016 In 2020, George County was only one of two counties that voted against replacing the state flag. The other was nearby Greene County.

The county is located in Mississippi's 4th congressional district, which has a Cook Partisan Voting Index of R+21 and is represented by Republican Steven Palazzo.

Communities

City
 Lucedale (county seat)

Census-designated places
 Agricola
 Benndale

Unincorporated places

 Basin
 Bexley
 Crossroads
 Merrill
 Shipman

See also

 Dry counties
 National Register of Historic Places listings in George County, Mississippi

References

External links
 George County Courthouse Pictures
 George County Sheriff's Office

 
Mississippi counties
Pascagoula metropolitan area
1910 establishments in Mississippi
Populated places established in 1910